Tanjung Leman is a coastal area in Mersing District, Johor, Malaysia. Tanjung Leman Beach is a beach which is popular among the locals.

References

Populated places in Johor